Mohsen Neysani (born August 15, 1982) is an Iranian football player who currently plays for Shahrdari Tabriz of the Iran Pro League.

Professional

Neysani played at Moghavemat Sepasi until 2010. In 2010, he joined Shahrdari Tabriz.

 Assist Goals

References

1982 births
Living people
Iranian footballers
Fajr Sepasi players
Shahrdari Tabriz players
Association football defenders